Miss Guadeloupe is a French beauty pageant which selects a representative for the Miss France national competition from the overseas region of Guadeloupe. The first Miss Guadeloupe was crowned in 1937, although the pageant was not held regularly until 1977.

The current Miss Guadeloupe is Indira Ampiot, who was crowned Miss Guadeloupe 2022 on 27 July 2022, and went on to be crowned Miss France 2023 as well. A total of four women from Guadeloupe have been crowned Miss France:
Véronique de la Cruz, who was crowned Miss France 1993
Corinne Coman, who was crowned Miss France 2003
Clémence Botino, who was crowned Miss France 2020
Indira Ampiot, who was crowned Miss France 2023

Results summary
Miss France: Véronique de la Cruz (1992); Corinne Coman (2002); Clémence Botino (2020); Indira Ampiot (2023)
1st Runner-Up: Sandra Bisson (2001); Ophély Mezino (2018)
2nd Runner-Up: Paulette Battet (1984)
3rd Runner-Up: 	Francette Bulin (1990); Ludmilla Canourgues (1994); Alicia Bausivoir (1995); Patricia Sellin (1996); Morgane Thérésine (2016)
4th Runner-Up: Joëlle Ursull (1978); Chloé Deher (2013)
5th Runner-Up: Elydie Billioti de Gage (1979)
6th Runner-Up: Micheline Babin (1980)
Top 12/Top 15: Marie-Laure Thomaseau (1989); Daïana Mary (2003); Mandy Falla (2007); Rebecca Erivan (2008); Chloé Mozar (2014); Kenza Andreze-Louison (2020)

Titleholders

Notes

References

External links

Miss France regional pageants
Beauty pageants in France
Women in Guadeloupe